Henry Hardinge, 1st Viscount Hardinge,  (30 March 1785 – 24 September 1856) was a British Army officer and politician. After serving in the Peninsular War and the Waterloo Campaign he became Secretary at War in Wellington's ministry. After a tour as Chief Secretary for Ireland in 1830 he became Secretary at War again in Sir Robert Peel's cabinet. He went on to be Governor-General of India at the time of the First Anglo-Sikh War and then Commander-in-Chief of the Forces during the Crimean War.

Army career
The son of the Rev, Henry Hardinge, Rector of Stanhope, and his wife Frances Best, he was educated at Durham School and Sevenoaks School. Hardinge entered the British Army on 23 July 1799 as an ensign in the Queen's Rangers, a corps then stationed in Upper Canada. He was promoted to lieutenant by purchase in the 4th Regiment of Foot on 27 March 1802 and transferred to the 1st Regiment of Foot on 11 July 1803 before becoming a captain of a company by purchase in the 57th Regiment of Foot on 21 April 1804. In February 1806 he was sent to the newly formed Staff College at High Wycombe.

He saw action at the Battle of Roliça on 17 August 1808, at the Battle of Vimeiro on 21 August 1808, where he was wounded, and at Corunna on 16 January 1809 where he was by the side of Sir John Moore when the latter was killed. He was promoted to major on 13 April 1809 and appointed deputy-quartermaster-general in the Portuguese army and was present at many of the battles of the Peninsular War. Promoted to lieutenant-colonel in 1811, he saved the day for the British at Battle of Albuera on 16 May 1811 by taking responsibility at a critical moment and strongly urging General Cole's division to advance. He took part in the Battle of Vitoria on 21 June 1813, where he was wounded again, and was also present at the Battle of the Pyrenees in July 1813 and the Battle of Nivelle on 10 November 1813. He commanded the Portuguese brigade at the Battle of Orthez on 27 February 1814 and the Battle of Toulouse on 10 April 1814. He was appointed Knight Commander of the Order of the Bath in January 1815.

When war broke out again in 1815 after Napoleon's escape from Elba, Hardinge returned to active service as a brigadier. Attached to the staff of the allied Prussian Army under Marshal Blucher, he was present at the Battle of Ligny on 16 June 1815, where he lost his left hand by a shot, and thus was not present at Waterloo two days later. Wellington presented him with a sword that had belonged to Napoleon. Hardinge remained attached to the Prussian army of occupation in France until 1818.

He was promoted to brevet colonel on 19 July 1821 and to major-general on 22 July 1830.

Political service

At the 1820 general election, Hardinge was returned to parliament as member for Durham. On 4 April 1823 he was appointed Clerk of the Ordnance a post he held until May 1827, and then again from January to May 1828. On 9 June 1828 he accepted the office of Secretary at War in Wellington's ministry, and was appointed a privy councillor. At the 1830 general election he transferred to the pocket borough of St Germans.

In July 1830 he exchanged portfolios with Lord Francis Leveson-Gower, becoming Chief Secretary for Ireland, but relinquished the post in November following the collapse of the Wellington–Peel ministry. He resigned his seat at St Germans in December and was elected for Newport, another Tory pocket borough, a week later. He held Newport at the 1831 general election and in 1832, after Newport was disenfranchised, stood in Launceston and was re-elected. He would remain in this seat until he stood down in May 1844.

He was appointed Chief Secretary for Ireland from December 1834 to April 1835, and then was Secretary at War once again in Sir Robert Peel's cabinet from 1841 to 1844. He was promoted to lieutenant-general in 1841. At this time he had a London home at Whitehall Gardens, Westminster.

In May 1844 he succeeded Lord Ellenborough as Governor-General of India. He was advanced to Knight Grand Cross of the Order of the Bath on 1 July 1844. Following the death of Maharajah Ranjit Singh tribal war broke out and the first Sikh War ensued in 1845. Hardinge, waiving his right to the supreme command, offered to serve as second in command under Sir Hugh Gough. At the Battle of Mudki on 18 December 1845 Gough commanded the right flank and Hardinge commanded the left flank. After further British successes at the Battle of Sobraon on 10 February 1846, the Battle of Ferozeshah on 21 December 1845 and the Battle of Aliwal on 28 January 1846, Hardinge concluded the campaign with the Treaty of Lahore with Maharajah Duleep Singh on 9 March 1846 and the Treaty of Amritsar with Maharajah Gulab Singh on 16 March 1846. He was created Viscount Hardinge of Lahore and of King's Newton in Derbyshire on 7 April 1846.

Recognising an annuity of £5,000 being paid by the East India Company, Parliament provided that Viscount Hardinge should continue to receive his full salary as Governor General. Under a subsequent Act, in recognition of his "great and brilliant services", Parliament settled an annuity of £3,000 on Lord Hardinge and the next two heirs male of his body, although this was not to be paid if the East India Company paid an annuity.

Commander-in-Chief

Hardinge returned to England in 1848, and became Master-General of the Ordnance on 5 March 1852; he succeeded the Duke of Wellington as commander-in-chief of the British Army on 28 September 1852. While in this position he had responsibility for the direction of the Crimean War, which he endeavoured to conduct on Wellington's principles — a system not altogether suited to the changed mode of warfare. He was promoted to brevet general on 20 June 1854 and field marshal on 2 October 1855. A commission was set up to investigate the failings of the British military during the Crimean campaign. As Hardinge was delivering the report of the commission to Queen Victoria and Prince Albert, he collapsed with a stroke. Albert helped him to a sofa, where despite being paralysed on one side, he continued to deliver his report, apologizing for the interruption.

He was also colonel of the 97th Regiment of Foot from 4 March 1833 and of the 57th Regiment of Foot from 31 May 1843.

Hardinge resigned his office of commander-in-chief in July 1856, owing to failing health, and died on 24 September 1856 at South Park near Tunbridge Wells. There is a memorial to him at St John the Baptist, Penshurst. He is buried in the churchyard at St. Peter, Fordcombe.

Family
In 1821 he married Lady Emily Jane, seventh daughter of Robert Stewart, 1st Marquess of Londonderry. They had two sons, and two daughters:

Charles Stewart Hardinge, 2nd Viscount Hardinge of Lahore and Kings Newton (2 Sep 1822 – 28 July 1894)
Arthur Edward Hardinge (2 Mar 1828 – 15 July 1892) married Mary Georgina Frances Ellis, daughter of Lt.-Col. Hon. Augustus Frederick Ellis. They had two sons, and three daughters, one of whom being Arthur Henry Hardinge.
Hon. Frances Elizabeth Hardinge (d. 9 July 1894) married Gen. Sir Arthur Cunynghame, son of Sir David Cunynghame, 5th Baronet. They had two sons, and three daughters.
Hon. Emily Caroline Hardinge (d. 4 Sep 1876). Unmarried, a lady-in-waiting to Princess Alice of the United Kingdom. 

His elder son, Charles Stewart, who had been his private secretary in India, was the 2nd Viscount Hardinge. The younger son of the 2nd Viscount, Charles Hardinge (b. 1858), became a prominent diplomat, and was appointed Viceroy of India in 1910, being created Baron Hardinge of Penshurst.

References

Bibliography

External links

 

|-

Hardinge, Henry Hardinge, 1st Viscount
Hardinge, Henry Hardinge, 1st Viscount
Hardinge, Henry Hardinge, 1st Viscount
Hardinge, Henry Hardinge, 1st Viscount
Hardinge, Henry Hardinge, 1st Viscount
Hardinge, Henry Hardinge, 1st Viscount
Hardinge, Henry Hardinge, 1st Viscount
Hardinge, Henry Hardinge, 1st Viscount
Conservative Party (UK) MPs for English constituencies
Hardinge, Henry Hardinge, 1st Viscount
Hardinge, Henry Hardinge, 1st Viscount
Hardinge, Henry Hardinge, 1st Viscount
Hardinge, Henry Hardinge, 1st Viscount
Hardinge, Henry Hardinge, 1st Viscount
UK MPs 1820–1826
UK MPs 1826–1830
UK MPs 1830–1831
UK MPs 1831–1832
UK MPs 1832–1835
UK MPs 1835–1837
UK MPs 1837–1841
UK MPs 1841–1847
UK MPs who were granted peerages
Members of the Parliament of the United Kingdom for City of Durham
Members of the Parliament of the United Kingdom for St Germans
Members of the Parliament of the United Kingdom for Newport (Cornwall)
Members of the Parliament of the United Kingdom for Launceston
Chief Secretaries for Ireland
Presidents of The Asiatic Society
People from Stanhope, County Durham
Peers of the United Kingdom created by Queen Victoria